Wade Wilson, also known as Deadpool, is a fictional character in 20th Century Fox's X-Men film series and later the Marvel Cinematic Universe (MCU) media franchise produced by Marvel Studios. He is portrayed by Ryan Reynolds and is based on the Marvel Comics character of the same name. The initial, heavily adapted interpretation of the character first appeared in X-Men Origins: Wolverine (2009) as a mutant mercenary and a member of Major William Stryker's black ops military team. Wilson is transformed by Stryker into a genetically altered mutant killer known as Weapon XI, but is defeated by his former teammates Logan and Victor Creed.

The creation of a revised timeline in X-Men: Days of Future Past (2014) would allow a more faithful adaptation of the character to feature in his self-titled film Deadpool (2016). This version is a dishonorably discharged Canadian Special Forces operative and terminal cancer patient who volunteers for an experimental treatment to awaken latent mutant genes in his body, giving him a regenerative healing factor that counteracts his illness but leaves him disfigured. Wilson adopts the name "Deadpool", kills the scientist responsible for his scarred appearance and reunites with his fiancee Vanessa Carlysle. In Deadpool 2 (2018), Wilson forms the X-Force to protect a young mutant named Russell Collins and avert his turn towards tyranny in the distant future. Following the acquisition of 21st Century Fox by Disney in 2019, it was announced that Deadpool would be integrated into the Marvel Cinematic Universe, beginning with Deadpool 3 (2024).

The character's portrayal in X-Men Origins: Wolverine was negatively received by both critics and fans for greatly deviating from the source material. Contrastingly, his characterization in the two Deadpool films was met with acclaim, with praise directed at Reynolds' performance and its faithfulness to the comics.

Concept, creation, and characterization

Development 

Artisan Entertainment had announced a deal with Marvel Entertainment in May 2000 to co-produce, finance, and distribute several films based on Marvel Comics' characters, including Deadpool, a newer character introduced in the 1990s. By February 2004, writer and director David S. Goyer and Ryan Reynolds were working on a Deadpool film at New Line Cinema. They had worked together on the Marvel film Blade: Trinity. Reynolds was interested in the part of Deadpool after learning that in the comics the character refers to his appearance as "Ryan Reynolds crossed with a Shar-Pei". New Line executive Jeff Katz, who thought Reynolds was the only actor suitable for the role, championed the idea. However, there were rights issues with 20th Century Fox and their X-Men films, and the project did not move forward.

By March 2005, Reynolds learned that Fox had expressed interest in a film featuring Deadpool. The character was set to make a cameo appearance in the 2009 film X-Men Origins: Wolverine, with Reynolds cast in the part. His role was expanded during the film's production. Katz was an executive at Fox at that point, and said that Deadpool was "nicely set up to be explored in his own way" in a future film. The film's portrayal deviates from the original comic character, "imbuing him with several superpowers and sewing his mouth shut". Deadpool apparently dies in the film, though a post-credits scene showing him still alive was added to the film shortly before its release. After the successful opening weekend of Wolverine, Fox officially began development on Deadpool, with Reynolds attached to star and X-Men producer Lauren Shuler Donner involved. The spinoff was set to ignore the Wolverine version of Deadpool and return to the character's roots with a slapstick tone and a "propensity to break the fourth wall".

At Fox, the film went through several directors before Tim Miller settled on the position, with Rhett Reese and Paul Wernick hired to write the script. Meanwhile, Reynolds took the lead role in Green Lantern, a film that was critically and financially unsuccessful. Due to this poor reception and the fact that a film based on Deadpool would most likely be rated R instead of PG-13, Fox became doubtful about the project, even after Reynolds produced test footage of himself in-character. However, the footage was eventually leaked in 2014 to enthusiastic reviews, prompting Fox to green-light the project. Reynolds attributed Fox's green-lighting of the film entirely to the leak. He, Miller and the writers had previously discussed leaking the footage themselves, and Reynolds initially thought that Miller had done so. He later believed the leak came from someone at Fox. In exchange for being able to make the film the way they wanted, Fox gave the crew a much smaller budget than is typical for superhero films.

Characterization 

In both timelines, Wade possesses a highly sarcastic sense of humor that irritates and annoys most of his enemies. He regularly insults and belittles his enemies. He feels no shame and can make a joke out of any situation, even after months of endless torture and being shaken by his subsequent transformation. Only a few select people can withstand his seemingly endless talking, and his mouth is sewn shut in the final act of X-Men Origins: Wolverine.

His personality is significantly more fleshed out in the new timeline. He loves cartoons, potty humor, Skee-Ball, classical music, television shows, rap music, and American pop culture. His favorite band is Wham! and George Michael, specifically, the song "Careless Whisper." He remains very movie-cultured, referencing The Matrix, RoboCop, Alien 3, Yentl, 127 Hours, Cocoon, Star Wars, Green Lantern (which also stars Ryan Reynolds), and even X-Men: Days of Future Past.

Like his comics counterpart, Wade himself is aware that he is a fictional character in a movie and belittles this by breaking the fourth wall and speaking directly to the audience. In Deadpool 2, when his autograph is requested by a fan, he signs it "Ryan Reynolds."

Despite his initial immaturity, Wade is a genuine, soft, good-hearted man, and in time becomes a very moral and heroic person to the point of sacrificing himself to save the mutant Russell Collins.  Although he is a mercenary, he agreed to scare off a young girl's stalker without being paid for his troubles, revealing he can be affectionate.  On matters of love, he can be surprisingly sensitive, feeling forced to abandon his girlfriend, Vanessa, due to his terminal cancer. He advises his taxi driver, Dopinder, to fight for the object of his affections, Gita.  After Vanessa's death, Wade develops a suicidal nature, yet his inability to die increases the decay of his already fractured psyche.  He is content to die of cancer in the Icebox until he finds a new purpose in protecting Russell from Cable.  After his near-death experience, he still has not accepted Vanessa's demise, so he uses Cable's time travel device to save her.

Reynolds worked with longtime trainer Don Saladino to get in shape for the role, gaining 7 pounds of lean muscle. Saladino commented that while they aimed to achieve an aesthetically pleasing appearance, they also wanted to get Reynolds "actual strength over superficial", so they spent extensive time working on Reynolds' mobility prior to working on actual strength.

Marvel Cinematic Universe 

After the acquisition of 21st Century Fox by The Walt Disney Company was announced in December 2017 and completed in March 2019, Disney CEO Bob Iger said that Deadpool would be integrated with the Marvel Cinematic Universe under Disney, and that the company would be willing to make future R-rated Deadpool films "as long as we let the audiences know what's coming". The Once Upon a Deadpool version of the film was being watched carefully by Disney and Marvel Studios to see whether it might inform how they could approach the character and integrate him into the PG-13 MCU.

In October 2019, Reese and Wernick said that they have a script in development, but were waiting for approval from Marvel Studios to begin production on the third film. Reese said, "[Deadpool] will live in the R-rated universe that we've created, and hopefully we'll be allowed to play a little bit in the MCU sandbox as well and incorporate him into that." In December 2019, Reynolds confirmed that a third Deadpool film was in development at Marvel Studios, which was confirmed by Marvel Studios President Kevin Feige in January 2021, with Reynolds reprising his role. The film will retain the R-rating of the prior films and will be set in the MCU. Feige described Wilson as a "very different type of character" in the MCU. In March 2022, Shawn Levy was revealed as the film's director after previously collaborating with Reynolds on Free Guy (2021) and The Adam Project (2022), while Rhett Reese and Paul Wernick were announced to be rewriting the Molyneux sisters' screenplay, reprising their duties from the first two Deadpool films. Filming is currently scheduled to begin in May 2023. Reynolds is also slated to produce the film alongside Kevin Feige through his production company Maximum Effort.

In May 2022, screenwriter Michael Waldron confirmed in an interview that there were discussions within Marvel regarding Deadpool making a cameo appearance in the film Doctor Strange in the Multiverse of Madness (2022), as he himself felt "[it] would’ve been crazy to not raise that" after the inclusions of other X-Men related elements in the film such as the Savage Land and the character Professor Charles Xavier (played by returning X-Men actor Patrick Stewart). However, Waldron would ultimately feel as if the film was an unfitting place to feature the character. The Marvel Studios: Assembled episode on the making of Multiverse of Madness also featured concept art depicting a "Deadpool dimension", an alternate world cityscape with multiple billboards adorned with Deadpool-themed posters and comic book art. A pair of sneakers inspired by Deadpool's costume appears in the main-on-end credits sequence of the Disney+ television series She-Hulk: Attorney at Law (2022), featured as part of a collection of Marvel Comics-inspired sneakers owned by Augustus Pugliese (Josh Segarra).

Appearances 

 In the original timeline, Wilson is first referenced in X2 (2003), his name appears on William Stryker's computer that contained files on multiple individuals and organizations related to mutants. 
 Wilson's first on-screen appearance in the original timeline, is X-Men Origins: Wolverine (2009).  This variant is a highly skilled, wisecracking, and amoral mercenary. He is supposedly killed by Victor Creed, but is later revealed to have been transformed by Major Stryker into a mutant killer "Weapon XI", who possessed other mutants' powers.  His former teammates Logan and Creed fight Weapon XI and manage to defeat and seemingly kill him.
 In Deadpool (2016), set in a revised timeline created by the X-Men.  This version is a mercenary who is diagnosed with late-stage cancer and turns to Weapon X after he is offered a cure.  One of the scientists, Francis "Ajax" tortures Wilson in order to catalyze the treatment, which eventually results in regressive mutant genes activating, causing the latter's disfigurement and healing factor. In response, Wilson develops a vendetta against Ajax and undergoes a quest to force him to fix his disfigurement before eventually killing him upon learning it would be impossible.
 In the short film, No Good Deed (2017), Wilson comes across an old man being mugged in an alley, and races to change into his Deadpool costume before he helps the man. As Wilson struggles to get dressed, the man is shot. Wilson emerges, wearing his costume, only to find the man dead and the mugger long gone.
 In Deadpool 2 (2018), after the death of his girlfriend Vanessa,  Wilson finds himself protecting an angst-ridden boy named Russell Collins from the time-traveling mutant Cable.
 In Deadpool and Korg React (2021), a promotional short film set in the Marvel Cinematic Universe (MCU).  Wilson invites Korg to make a trailer reaction video for the trailer for Free Guy. Taika Waititi voices Korg in the short, reprising his role from the MCU films Thor: Ragnarok (2017), Avengers: Endgame (2019), and Thor: Love and Thunder (2022).
 Deadpool 3 (2024) is currently in active development, set in the MCU, with Marvel Studios producing the film and Ryan Reynolds confirmed to reprise the role. Reynolds will co-produce the film alongside Marvel Studios president Kevin Feige through his production company Maximum Effort.

Fictional character biography

Original timeline

Team X 
In the original continuity, Wade Wilson is a soldier and mercenary with enhanced human reflexes and agility due to being a mutant. During the Vietnam War, Wilson is a member of a Black Ops group called Team X under the command of William Stryker. The team also includes James "Logan" Howlett, Victor Creed, Frederick Dukes, John Wraith, Chris Bradley, and Agent Zero. During one mission, while trying to find a mineral used to create adamantium, Stryker orders the team to massacre an entire village. Logan stops it, and leaves the group. After his departure, other team-members begin to question the team's morality and begin to leave, including Wilson, until only Creed and Agent Zero remain faithful to Stryker.

Brainwashed by Stryker 
Six years later, Wilson was captured and taken to Stryker's base at Three Mile Island where he is experimented on for the Weapon XI project. He was killed by Creed, and his body was used as a catalyst for the Weapon XI project.  With Creed's help, Stryker collects DNA from several mutants (including Wraith, Bradley, Scott Summers, and Logan), whose powers could be used collectively within one body without destroying it.  Stryker also gave Wilson an adamantium skeleton like Logan's.  Stryker dubs him as the "mutant killer" known as the "Deadpool".  After freeing the other mutants captured by Stryker and Creed in Three Mile Island, Logan is stopped by the now activated Weapon XI.  Logan faces Weapon XI alone, giving the mutants time to escape and eventually Logan climbs atop a cooling tower at Stryker's plant, Weapon XI follows in an instant using Wraith's teleportation ability.  Logan is about to be decapitated by Weapon XI (under the command of Stryker), Creed later joined to help Logan, Weapon XI is beheaded and seemingly defeated by Logan. However, Wilson survives decapitation.

Revised timeline

Early life 
In a new continuity created through the aversion of the war between Sentinels, humans and mutantkind,  Wade Wilson was born in Regina, Saskatchewan, Canada in 1975.  He is now a former Special Forces soldier who was dishonorably discharged, becoming a mercenary operating at Sister Margaret's School for Wayward Girls, where he meets and eventually proposes to hustler, Vanessa Carlysle.

Becoming Deadpool 

Wilson is diagnosed with late-stage cancer shortly after being engaged to Vanessa. He is approached by a representative of an unknown organization, who offers him a cure in addition to powers "most men only dream of".  While he initially declines, he eventually returns to accept the offer.  However, not all is as it seems, as he soon realizes they are actually attempting to create an army of superpowered individuals under their control.  Wilson undergoes numerous forms of torture at the hands of Ajax and Angel Dust, though he never loses his sense of humor. Eventually, Ajax is successful in activating Wilson's dormant mutant genes, which allows him to heal and regenerate from any wound. The only problem, however, is that it also horrifically deforms his entire outer layer of skin. Wade attempted to escape and destroyed the facility in the process, but ultimately lost to Ajax in battle. Wilson is presumed dead, but survives thanks to his new-found abilities.

Afraid to confront Vanessa in his current appearance, Wilson takes on the moniker "Deadpool", after remembering when his best friend Weasel bet in the Sister Margaret's group "dead pool" that he would die, and begins hunting for Ajax to force him to fix him. He eventually tracks him down, though his attempt to kill him is interrupted by Colossus and Negasonic Teenage Warhead members of the X-Men. The two attempt to apprehend Wilson, however he manages to escape by severing his own hand.  Shortly after, Ajax targets and kidnaps Vanessa to get back at Wade, hoping to lure him out and kill him successfully. Upon learning of this, Deadpool contacts Colossus and Negasonic Teenage Warhead for their assistance. The three confront Ajax and his men, where Deadpool is able to save Vanessa and ultimately kill Ajax, much to Colossus' dismay. Despite his appearance, Vanessa still accepts Wade, and the two embrace.

Stopping Cable 

Two years later, Wilson continues working as a successful mercenary-for-hire, taking down the most despicable and untouchable of criminals. On the day of his anniversary with Vanessa, Wilson is assigned to kill mobster Sergei Valishnikov. However, when Deadpool attacks his base, Valishnikov hides in a panic room. Since waiting for Sergei to get out was going to take too much time, Wade decides to let him go for the time being in order to spend time with Vanessa. Unfortunately, Valishnikov and his men decide to retaliate against Deadpool and attack him at his apartment, inadvertently killing Vanessa, after which Deadpool finishes the hit in vengeance.  For the next six months, Wilson tries to commit suicide by blowing himself up. This ultimately fails, however, due to his healing factor, and his pieces remain alive to be found and reassembled by Colossus.

Colossus manages to convince Wade to join the X-Men as a form of physical and mental healing after the death of Vanessa. He becomes a trainee and accompanies Colossus and Negasonic Teenage Warhead to a standoff between authorities and an unstable young mutant named Russell Collins.  After trying to calm Russell down and prevent any more damage, Wade realizes that the orphanage where Russell lives, labeled a mutant "reeducation center," has abused him and Wade subsequently kills one of the staff members, leading to his and Russell's arrest. They are taken to the Ice Box and their powers inhibited with special collars.  Meanwhile, a cybernetic soldier from the future, Cable, arrives in 2018 to murder Russell before he can kill his first victim, as Cable's family is murdered by a future version of Russell. Cable's breaking into the Ice Box allows for Wilson and Russell to escape their cell, and when Cable comes to kill Russell, Wilson's collar is broken in the melee. With his powers restored, he attempts to defend Russell, but is beaten by Cable who takes Vanessa's Skee-Ball token. Cable nearly beats Wade to death, and Wade experiences a vision of Vanessa in the afterlife where she convinces him to go after Russell and save him.

Forming X-Force and teaming-up with Cable 
Wilson returns to life and forms a superhero team of his own called X-Force. They attempt to assault a convoy transferring Russell and several other Ice Box prisoners by parachuting from a plane, but the only survivors of the team end up being Wilson and Domino, a mutant whose powers pertain to luck. The two assault the convoy alone, finding Cable already on the scene. While Domino drives the truck and Cable fights Wilson, Russell releases fellow prisoner Juggernaut, who agrees to assist Russell in killing his abusive former headmaster. Before escaping, Juggernaut destroys the convoy and tears Wade in half, allowing the two of them to escape unhindered.

Cable reluctantly agrees to work with a recovering Wilson and Domino in order to stop Russell's first murder. The team is initially overpowered by Juggernaut while Russell terrorizes his headmaster until Colossus, Negasonic Teenage Warhead, and her girlfriend Yukio arrive and helped to hold him off. Wilson attempts to talk Russell down, even putting on an inhibitor collar to negate his powers as a show of good faith. This ultimately fails, however, and Cable shoots the boy. Wilson jumps in front of the bullet and is fatally wounded, as his healing factor is negated by the collar. Feeling it was his time to go, he refuses to let anyone remove the collar, choosing to be reunited with Vanessa in the afterlife. Russell is inspired by Wilson's sacrifice and chooses not to kill the headmaster, preventing the death of Cable's family in the future.  Cable decides to use his final time-traveling charge to go back and hide Vanessa's Skee-Ball token inside Deadpool's uniform, in the spot where he would be shot. Wade still takes the bullet for Russell, but this time it is stopped by the Skee-Ball token and Wade survived. Despite this, Russell is still inspired by Wade's sacrifice and does not kill the headmaster. As the group leaves the scene, however, Wade's taxi-driver friend Dopinder arrives and runs over the fleeing headmaster, killing him anyway.

Altering history 
Negasonic Teenage Warhead and Yukio manage to fix Cable's time-traveling device, and Wade uses it to make several alterations to the timeline. He first goes back and saves both Vanessa and former X-Force member Peter. He then goes back and shoots the Weapon XI version of Wade Wilson several times, confusing the bystanding Wolverine. After this, he makes a stop in the late 2000s to shoot Ryan Reynolds in the back of the head as he is reading the script for the film Green Lantern (2011), before entering 1889 in order to care for a newborn Adolf Hitler and prevent his turn towards dictatorship.

In other media

Television 

 Audio of Reynolds' performance in Deadpool (2016) was used in test footage for a cancelled animated Deadpool series being developed by Donald Glover & Stephen Glover for the television network FXX.
 Ryan Reynolds made an in-character guest appearance to promote Deadpool 2 (2018) on The Late Show with Stephen Colbert, reprising his role as part of the opening monologue for the episode aired on May 16, 2018.

Video games 
 Wade Wilson / Weapon XI appears in the X-Men Origins: Wolverine film tie-in game, voiced by Steven Blum.
 Reynolds reprised his role as Wade Wilson / Deadpool for the iOS and Android mobile game Marvel Strike Force.

Web series 
 Reynolds reprised his role as Wade Wilson / Deadpool by co-narrating the Honest Trailers for Deadpool, Logan, which was the series' 200th video, and Deadpool 2.

Reception 
Reynolds' initial portrayal of Wade Wilson / Deadpool / Weapon XI in X-Men Origins: Wolverine received significant critical and fan backlash. Many observed the lack of connection between the film's depiction of the character and his traditional counterpart in the comics. Writing for the Huffington Post in an advance-screening review, Scott Mendelsohn panned the film's depiction of Deadpool and subsequent transformation into Weapon XI, amidst other characters featured in the film from X-Men comics, affirming that "The climax, for reasons that I won't reveal, will absolutely infuriate devotees of [Deadpool] (for comparison, imagine if, at the end of Spider-Man 3, Eddie Brock turned into The Vulture)". In her retrospective of the film, Rachel Edidin of WIRED described the film's take on the character as "Deadpool, with his mouth sewn shut, which kind of fundamentally misses the point of the Merc with a Mouth", while Collider's Matt Goldberg deemed Wilson's codename of "Weapon XI" as, "a fitting symbol for the film because it's a bunch of mutant powers dumped into a dummy".

In contrast, Reynolds' portrayal of the title character in the two standalone Deadpool films was critically acclaimed. Writing for The Guardian, Peter Bradshaw called Deadpool (2016) "the funniest Ryan Reynolds film since Van Wilder: Party Liaison", while going on to observe that "Ryan Reynolds is developing something self-deprecatory and knowing in his handsomeness, a Clooneyesque goof, which works with the comedy here". Manohla Dargis of The New York Times praised Reynolds' subsequent redemption as the character, highlighting the first Deadpool film as proof that "the director, Tim Miller, and Mr. Reynolds can do more than hit the same bombastic notes over and over again", while calling his performance, "career rehab (or penance) for Green Lantern, the 2011 dud he fronted for DC Comics". In his review for Variety, Justin Chang commented on the film's ability to leverage Reynolds' "funnyman sensibilities", going on to exclaim that " through sheer timing, gusto and verve (and an assist from Julian Clarke's deft editing), Reynolds gives all this self-referential potty talk a delirious comic momentum".

Accolades 

Reynolds has received numerous nominations and awards for his portrayal of Wade Wilson.

Notes

References

External links 
 

Canadian superheroes
Deadpool (film series)
Deadpool characters
Fictional Canadian people
Fictional LGBT characters in film
Fictional United States Army Special Forces personnel
Fictional assassins
Fictional characters who break the fourth wall
Fictional characters with cancer
Fictional characters with disfigurements
Fictional genetically engineered characters
Fictional gunfighters in films
Fictional knife-fighters
Fictional mass murderers
Fictional mercenaries
Fictional military personnel in films
Fictional outlaws
Fictional pansexuals
Fictional soldiers
Fictional swordfighters in films
Fictional vigilantes
Film characters introduced in 2009
LGBT superheroes
Male characters in film
Marvel Cinematic Universe characters
Marvel Comics characters who can move at superhuman speeds
Marvel Comics characters with accelerated healing
Marvel Comics characters with superhuman strength
Marvel Comics film characters
Marvel Comics military personnel
Marvel Comics mutants
Superheroes with alter egos
Time travelers
X-Men (film series) characters
Fictional people from the 20th-century